Justice is a village in Cook County, Illinois, United States, established in 1911. Per the 2020 census, the population was 12,600.

Geography

A major road running through the town is Archer Avenue (Illinois Route 171); in addition, Justice lies close to Interstate 55 (also called the Stevenson Expressway, after Adlai Stevenson) and Interstate 294 just east of La Grange Road (U.S. Route 45).

Demographics
As of the 2020 census there were 12,600 people, 4,644 households, and 3,119 families residing in the village. The racial makeup of the village was 62.45% White, 20.35% African American, 0.71% Native American, 1.80% Asian, 0.02% Pacific Islander, 5.69% from other races, and 8.98% from two or more races. Hispanic or Latino of any race were 16.48% of the population.

There were 4,644 households, out of which 59.80% had children under the age of 18 living with them, 43.56% were married couples living together, 17.01% had a female householder with no husband present, and 32.84% were non-families. 29.59% of all households were made up of individuals, and 8.61% had someone living alone who was 65 years of age or older. The average household size was 3.28 and the average family size was 2.73.

The village's age distribution consisted of 23.0% under the age of 18, 13.9% from 18 to 24, 32.4% from 25 to 44, 19.9% from 45 to 64, and 10.9% who were 65 years of age or older. The median age was 32.0 years. For every 100 females, there were 89.6 males. For every 100 females age 18 and over, there were 90.1 males.

The median income for a household in the village was $57,523, and the median income for a family was $64,258. Males had a median income of $40,647 versus $30,441 for females. The per capita income for the village was $27,526. About 16.1% of families and 18.8% of the population were below the poverty line, including 29.6% of those under age 18 and 20.2% of those age 65 or over.

Note: the US Census treats Hispanic/Latino as an ethnic category. This table excludes Latinos from the racial categories and assigns them to a separate category. Hispanics/Latinos can be of any race.

Government
The Village President is Krzysztof (Kris) Wasowicz. The Village Clerk is David R. Kroll. Village Trustees are Jeffrey Allen, Gabriel Lopez, Melanie Kuban, Frances Mills, John Obrochta, and Stanislaw Ogorek.

Justice is in Illinois's 3rd congressional district.

Education
Elementary and middle school students from Justice attend schools in Indian Springs School District 109. High school students go on to Argo Community High School District 217 in neighboring Summit.

References

External links
 Village of Justice official website

 
Villages in Illinois
Villages in Cook County, Illinois
Chicago metropolitan area
Populated places established in 1911